"Do Your Thing" is a song by co-written and performed by 7 Mile, issued as the third and final single from their eponymous debut album. It was the group's only song to chart on the Billboard Hot 100, peaking at #50 in 1998.

Music video

The official music video for the song was directed by Steve Conner.

Chart positions

References

External links
 

1997 songs
1998 singles
7 Mile (band) songs
Crave Records singles
Song recordings produced by Troy Oliver
Songs written by Troy Oliver